The 2018–19 World Skate Europe Cup was the 39th season of the World Skate Europe Cup, the first one with the new name of the formerly known as CERS Cup, Europe's second club roller hockey competition organized by World Skate Europe.
Lleida Llista Blava won its second title in a row.

Teams 
28 teams from seven national associations qualified for the competition. League positions of the previous season shown in parentheses.

Bracket
The draw was held at World Skate Europe headquarters in Lisbon, Portugal.

Round of 32
The first leg was played on 20 October and the second leg on 17 November 2018.

|}

Round of 16
The first leg was played on 1 December 2018 and the second leg on 19 January 2019.

|}

Quarterfinals
The first leg was played on 16 February and the second leg on 9 March 2019 (with exception Valdagno-Viareggio on 16 March).

|}

Final Four
The Final Four was played on 27 and 28 April in Lleida, Spain.

See also
2018–19 CERH European League
2018 Rink Hockey Continental Cup
2019 Rink Hockey Continental Cup
2018–19 CERH Women's European Cup

References

External links
 CERH website
  Roller Hockey links worldwide
  Mundook-World Roller Hockey

World Skate Europe Cup
CERS Cup
CERS Cup